Montevago (Sicilian: Muntivau) is a comune (municipality) in the Province of Agrigento in the Italian region Sicily, located about  southwest of Palermo and about  northwest of Agrigento.

Montevago borders the following municipalities: Castelvetrano, Menfi, Partanna, Salaparuta, Santa Margherita di Belice.

Twinnings
 Piešťany, Slovakia
 Tekirdağ, Turkey

References

External links
 Official website 

Cities and towns in Sicily